A Polish Vampire in Burbank is a 1983 horror comedy film. The plot involves an inexperienced vampire named Dupah ("ass" in Polish), played by director Mark Pirro, who is reluctant to bite his first victim.

Pirro had originally intended for the film to star Grease actor Eddie Deezen, who had agreed to appear in it as a favor to a friend, but he left the production shortly after shooting began. Pirro reworked Deezen's scenes into flashbacks, using audio clips to voice the skeletal remains of his character, and played the lead role of Dupah himself.

Filmed for just $2,500, Pirro sold A Polish Vampire in Burbank to a home video company for $40,000, and it went on to gross $500,000 in cassette sales. The minor character of the Queerwolf would later be featured in Pirro's 1988 film Curse of the Queerwolf.

Cast

References

External links
 
 "An Interview with a Polish Vampire" at pirromount.com

1980s comedy horror films
1983 films
Films shot in Los Angeles County, California
Vampire comedy films
1983 comedy films
1980s English-language films